Low-molecular-weight kininogen is a form of kininogen, which has been identified in mice, guinea pigs, and whales.

It is also found in humans.

References

External links
 

Kinin–kallikrein system